Abraham Johannes Jacobus "Braam" van Straaten (born 28 September 1971) is a former South African rugby union footballer. He was capable of playing either at fly-half or centre, and represented the Springboks in 21 tests from 1999 to 2001, scoring 221 points.

Van Straaten was born in Pretoria and made a relatively late start to professional rugby, making his debut for the Bulls in 1996 at the age of 24.

Joining the legion of former Springbok Rugby players that have participated in the Absa Cape Epic mountain bike stage race, Van Straaten took on the challenge in 2009 and successfully completed the race with partner Corne Klem.

References

1971 births
Living people
Leeds Tykes players
Sale Sharks players
South African rugby union players
Stormers players
Western Province (rugby union) players
South Africa international rugby union players
Bulls (rugby union) players
Griquas (rugby union) players
Rugby union fly-halves
Rugby union players from Pretoria